The Broncos–Patriots rivalry is a National Football League (NFL) rivalry between the Denver Broncos and New England Patriots (known as the Boston Patriots until 1971).

History 

The Broncos and Patriots met twice annually during the American Football League (AFL) years from 1960 to 1969 (with the exception of 1967 and 1969), and played in the first-ever AFL game on September 9, 1960. Since , the two teams have met frequently during the regular season, including nine consecutive seasons from 1995 to 2003. As of the end of the  season, the two teams have met in the playoffs five times, with the Broncos owning a 4–1 record. The teams' postseason meeting in the 1986 AFC Divisional playoffs was John Elway's first career playoff win, while the teams' second postseason meeting in the 2005 AFC Divisional playoffs was the Broncos' first playoff win since Elway's retirement after the 1998 season. The game was also notable for Champ Bailey's 100-yard interception that resulted in a touchdown-saving tackle by Benjamin Watson at the 1-yard line, although the Broncos would eventually score the touchdown shortly thereafter. This victory for the Broncos resulted in handing Tom Brady his first ever postseason loss as a starting quarterback after beginning his postseason career 10–0, while also ending the longest postseason winning streak in NFL history, which is ten games.

On October 11, 2009, the two teams met with former Patriots' offensive coordinator, Josh McDaniels as the Broncos' head coach. Both teams wore their AFL 50th anniversary jerseys. The game featured a 98-yard drive in the fourth quarter, with a game-tying touchdown pass from Kyle Orton to Brandon Marshall, followed by an overtime drive led by Orton that resulted in a 41-yard game-winning field goal by Matt Prater. The two teams met in the  2011 AFC Divisional playoffs, with the Patriots blowing out Tim Tebow and the Broncos by a score of 45–10. The Broncos' rivalry with the Patriots later intensified when longtime Indianapolis Colts' quarterback Peyton Manning became the Broncos' starting quarterback from 2012 to 2015. Manning and Patriots' quarterback Tom Brady maintained a legendary rivalry from  until Manning's retirement after the  season. Though Brady dominated Manning in regular season play, winning nine of twelve meetings (which includes winning all three meetings as a member of the Broncos), Manning won three of five playoff meetings and 3 of 4 AFC Championship Games (which includes going 2–0 in AFC Championship Games as a member of the Broncos), the last of which was a Broncos' 20–18 win in the 2015 AFC Championship Game.

Since Manning's retirement, the teams have met three times, with the road team winning each time. New England won 16-3 in 2016 and 41-16 in 2017, with both games being in Denver. Meanwhile, the Broncos pulled off a 18-12 road upset in 2020. The 2020 game was notable as it was the first Broncos-Patriots meeting since 2000 that Tom Brady was not the Patriots QB, as he signed with the Buccaneers after the 2019 season. In the 2020 matchup, Broncos starting QB Drew Lock became the youngest QB ever to defeat Bill Belichick at Gillette Stadium, as well as only the second QB ever to throw multiple interceptions in a road game against Belichick's Patriots and win the game.

Game results 

All-time results

|-
| 1960
| style="| 
| style="| Broncos  31–24
| style="| Broncos  13–10
| Broncos  2–0
| First meeting in the series is played at Nickerson Field in Boston. Broncos placed in AFL Western Division and the Patriots are placed in the AFL Eastern Division.
|-
| 1961
| style="| 
| style="| Patriots  28–24
| style="| Patriots  45–17
| Tie  2–2
| 
|-
| 1962
| style="| 
| style="| Patriots  33–29
| style="| Patriots  41–16
| Patriots  4–2
| 
|-
| 1963
| Tie 1–1
| style="| Broncos  14–10
| style="| Patriots  40–21
| Patriots  5–3
| Patriots lose 1963 AFL Championship.
|-
| 1964
| style="| 
| style="| Patriots  39–10
| style="| Patriots  12–7
| Patriots  7–3
| 
|-
| 1965
| Tie 1–1
| style="| Patriots  28–20
| style="| Broncos  27–10
| Patriots  8–4
| 
|-
| 1966
| Tie 1–1
| style="| Patriots  24–10
| style="| Broncos  17–10
| Patriots  9–5
| 
|-
| 1967
| style="| 
| style="| Broncos  26–21
| no game
| Patriots  9–6
| 
|-
| 1968
| Tie 1–1
| style="| Patriots  20–17
| style="| Broncos  35–14
| Patriots  10–7
| 
|-
| 1969
| style="| 
| style="| Broncos  35–7
| no game
| Patriots  10–8
| 
|-

|-
| 
| style="| Broncos  45–21
| Mile High Stadium
| Patriots  10–9
| First meeting since the AFL–NFL merger. First meeting in the series in which the Patriots played as the New England Patriots.
|-
| 
| style="| Patriots  38–14
| Schaefer Stadium
| Patriots  11–9
| 
|-
| 
| style="| Broncos  45–10
| Mile High Stadium
| Patriots  11–10
| 
|-

|-
| 
| style="| Patriots  23–14
| Schaefer Stadium
| Patriots  12–10
| 
|-
| 
| style="| Broncos  26–19
| Mile High Stadium
| Patriots  12–11
| 
|-
| 
| style="| Broncos  27–20
| Mile High Stadium
| Tie  12–12
| 
|- style="background:#f2f2f2; font-weight:bold;"
| 1986 Playoffs
| style="| Broncos  22–17
| Mile High Stadium
| Broncos  13–12
| AFC Divisional Round. First postseason meeting in the series. Broncos lose Super Bowl XXI.
|-
| 
| style="| Broncos  31–20
| Mile High Stadium
| Broncos  14–12
| Broncos lose Super Bowl XXII.
|-
| 
| style="| Broncos  21–10
| Mile High Stadium
| Broncos  15–12
| Home team wins ten straight meetings.
|-

|-
| rowspan="2"| 
| style="| Broncos  9–6
| Foxboro Stadium
| rowspan="2"| Broncos  17–12
| 
|-
| style="| Broncos  20–3
| Mile High Stadium
| Marks the only time since the AFL–NFL merger that both teams have met twice in the regular season.
|-
| 
| style="| Broncos  37–3
| Foxboro Stadium
| Broncos  18–12
| 
|-
| 
| style="| Broncos  34–8
| Foxboro Stadium
| Broncos  19–12
| Patriots lose Super Bowl XXXI.
|-
| 
| style="| Broncos  34–13
| Mile High Stadium
| Broncos  20–12
| Broncos win Super Bowl XXXII.
|-
| 
| style="| Broncos  27–21
| Mile High Stadium
| Broncos  21–12
| Broncos win 11 consecutive meetings. Broncos also win 11 consecutive home meetings. Broncos win Super Bowl XXXIII.
|-
| 
| style="| Patriots  24–23
| Foxboro Stadium
| Broncos  21–13
| Last meeting at Foxboro Stadium.
|-

|-
| 
| style="| Patriots  28–19
| Mile High Stadium
| Broncos  21–14
| Last meeting at Mile High Stadium. First time the Patriots win in Denver since 1968.
|-
| 
| style="| Broncos  31–20
| Invesco Field at Mile High
| Broncos  22–14
| First meeting at Empower Field at Mile High (previously named Invesco Field at Mile High, Sports Authority Field at Mile High, and Broncos Stadium). First start for Tom Brady in the series. Patriots win Super Bowl XXXVI.
|-
| 
| style="| Broncos  24–16
| Gillette Stadium
| Broncos  23–14
| First meeting at Gillette Stadium.
|-
| 
| style="| Patriots  30–26
| Invesco Field at Mile High
| Broncos  23–15
| Down 24–23 and punting from their own 1-yard line with just under 3 minutes remaining in regulation, the Patriots elected to take an intentional safety to increase the Broncos lead to 26–23 but to take the free kick from their own 20-yard line in an attempt to get a defensive stop and better field position. The strategy worked as the Patriots forced a three-and-out and began their eventual game-winning drive beyond their own 40-yard line with just over 2 minutes remaining. Patriots' David Givens scored the touchdown with 30 seconds remaining. Patriots win Super Bowl XXXVIII.
|-
| 
| style="| Broncos  28–20
| Invesco Field at Mile High
| Broncos  24–15
| 
|- style="background:#f2f2f2; font-weight:bold;"
| 2005 Playoffs
| style="| Broncos  27–13
| Invesco Field at Mile High
| Broncos  25–15
| AFC Divisional Round. Broncos hand Tom Brady his first ever postseason loss after starting 10–0.
|-
| 
| style="| Broncos  17–7
| Gillette Stadium
| Broncos  26–15
| 
|-
| 
| style="| Patriots  41–7
| Gillette Stadium
| Broncos  26–16
| 
|-
| 
| style="| Broncos  20–17
| Invesco Field at Mile High
| Broncos  27–16
| 
|-

|-
| 
| style="| Patriots  41–23
| Sports Authority Field at Mile High
| Broncos  27–17
| Patriots lose Super Bowl XLVI.
|- style="background:#f2f2f2; font-weight:bold;"
| 2011 Playoffs
| style="| Patriots  45–10
| Gillette Stadium
| Broncos  27–18
| AFC Divisional Round. Tom Brady throws postseason record 5 TD's as the Patriots advance.
|-
| 
| style="| Patriots  31–21
| Gillette Stadium
| Broncos  27–19
| First meeting of the Tom Brady–Peyton Manning rivalry in which Peyton Manning is the Broncos' QB.
|-
| 
| style="| Patriots  
| Gillette Stadium
| Broncos  27–20
| Patriots overcome 24–0 deficit in their overtime victory.  Broncos lose Super Bowl XLVIII.
|- style="background:#f2f2f2; font-weight:bold;"
| 2013 Playoffs
| style="| Broncos  26–16
| Sports Authority Field at Mile High
| Broncos  28–20
| AFC Championship Game.
|-
| 
| style="| Patriots  43–21
| Gillette Stadium
| Broncos  28–21
| Patriots win Super Bowl XLIX.
|-
| 
| style="| Broncos  
| Sports Authority Field at Mile High
| Broncos  29–21
| Broncos hand the 10–0 Patriots their first loss of the season. Only meeting from 2012–2015 that Peyton Manning did not start as the Broncos' quarterback in the series. Broncos win Super Bowl 50.
|- style="background:#f2f2f2; font-weight:bold;"
| 2015 Playoffs
| style="| Broncos  20–18
| Sports Authority Field at Mile High
| Broncos  30–21
| AFC Championship Game. Broncos get defensive stop on a game-tying two-point conversion attempt by the Patriots with 13 seconds remaining in regulation after Stephen Gostkowski missed a critical extra point early in the game. Last meeting in the Tom Brady–Peyton Manning rivalry.
|-
| 
| style="| Patriots  16–3
| Sports Authority Field at Mile High
| Broncos  30–22
| Patriots win Super Bowl LI.
|-
| 
| style="| Patriots  41–16
| Sports Authority Field at Mile High
| Broncos  30–23
| Last start for Tom Brady in the series. Patriots lose Super Bowl LII.
|-

|-
| 
| style="| Broncos  18–12
| Gillette Stadium
| Broncos  31–23
| 
|-
| 
| 
| Empower Field at Mile High
|
|
|-

|-
| AFL regular season
| style="|
| Patriots 6–4 
| Tie 4–4
|  
|-
| NFL regular season
| style="|
| Broncos 13–5
| Patriots 7–6
|  
|-
| AFL and NFL regular season
| style="|
| Broncos 17–11
| Patriots 11–10
|  
|-
| Postseason
| style="|
| Broncos 4–0
| Patriots 1–0
| AFC Divisional playoffs: 1986, 2005, 2011. AFC Championship Game: 2013, 2015.
|-
| Regular and postseason 
| style="|
| Broncos 21–11
| Patriots 12–10
| 
|-

References

Denver Broncos
New England Patriots
National Football League rivalries
New England Patriots rivalries
Denver Broncos rivalries